Haris Džinović (born 26 September 1951) is a Bosnian and former Yugoslavian folk singer, composer and lyricist.

Džinović is one of the best known singers of Southeastern Europe, having been active on the music scene since 1981, when he founded his own group Sar e Roma, with which he recorded three albums from 1982 to 1985. He has been a solo singer since 1989.

Discography

As a member of Sar e Roma 

 Kao Cigani (1982)
 Kiko, Kiko (1983)
 Romske pjesme/Gypsy Songs (1985)

On its own 

 Haris (1989)
 Haris (1991)
 Haris Džinović (2000)
 Magic (2009)
 Haris (2017)

References

External links
 

1951 births
Living people
Singers from Sarajevo
Musicians from Sarajevo
20th-century Bosnia and Herzegovina male singers
Bosnia and Herzegovina folk singers
Bosnia and Herzegovina folk-pop singers
Yugoslav male singers
Grand Production artists